1994 in Ghana details events of note that happened in Ghana in the year 1994.

Incumbents
 President: Jerry John Rawlings
 Vice President: Kow Nkensen Arkaah
 Chief Justice: Philip Edward Archer

Events

January

February
3rd - ethnic violence erupts between Konkomba and Nanumba tribal groups. The two groups are in the Northern region.

March
6th  - 38th independence anniversary held.

April

May

June

July
1st - Republic day celebrations held across the country.

August
 - President Jerry Rawlings, becomes chairman of the Economic Community of West African States (ECOWAS).

September

October

November

December
Annual Farmers' Day celebrations held in all regions of the country.

Deaths

National holidays
 January 1: New Year's Day
 March 6: Independence Day
 May 1: Labor Day
 December 25: Christmas
 December 26: Boxing day

In addition, several other places observe local holidays, such as the foundation of their town. These are also "special days."

References